Hague & McNamara was an Irish architectural firm active from 1899 until at least 1907 in Dublin active throughout Ireland. It was formed by the widow of recently deceased architect William Hague Jr. and his managing director T. F. McNamara. Hague had died in 1899 and the practice continued out of his office at Hague's former address on Dawson Street, Dublin.

Works
1902–1906 – St. Matthew's RC Church, Ballymahon, County Longford
1904 – Temperance Hall, Longford, County Longford
1904–1906 – St. Mary's RC Church, Finea, County Westmeath

References	

Architecture firms of Ireland
Architects of cathedrals
Irish ecclesiastical architects
Design companies established in 1899
Design companies disestablished in 1907
1899 establishments in Ireland
1907 disestablishments in Ireland
Defunct companies of Ireland
Gothic Revival architects